Bruno Moretti  (1941 – 1 November 2021) was an Australian Paralympic competitor.

Moretti was born in Ivanhoe, Victoria in 1940. His spine was dislocated while he was being delivered at birth, four hours after his twin brother.

He won a silver medal in men's class b table tennis at the 1960 Rome Paralympics with Bill Mather-Brown.

At the 1962 Commonwealth Paraplegic Games, Perth, Western Australia, he won four gold medals - basketball, weightlifting and table tennis (two) and three bronze medals in athletics. 

At the 1968 Tel Aviv Paralympics, he won a gold medal in the Men's Slalom A event and two silver medals in the Men's 100 m Wheelchair A and Men's 4x40 m Relay open events; he also participated in table tennis events and in the Australia men's national wheelchair basketball team. He coached Australia's wheelchair basketball team at the 1984 New York/Stoke Mandeville Paralympics.

Moretti was a founding member of Disability Sport & Recreation and contributed significantly to the disabled sports movement after his retirement from competition. He was awarded life membership in 1993.

He was married to Scarlette, and had one son, Domenico. Moretti died in Melbourne on 1 November 2021, at the age of 80.

References

External links
Bruno Moretti interviewed by Nikki Henningham in the Australian Centre for Paralympic Studies oral history project - sound recording, Canberra, National Library of Australia, 2010

1941 births
2021 deaths
Paralympic athletes of Australia
Paralympic table tennis players of Australia
Paralympic wheelchair basketball players of Australia
Table tennis players at the 1960 Summer Paralympics
Athletes (track and field) at the 1968 Summer Paralympics
Table tennis players at the 1968 Summer Paralympics
Medalists at the 1960 Summer Paralympics
Medalists at the 1968 Summer Paralympics
Wheelchair basketball players at the 1968 Summer Paralympics
Paralympic gold medalists for Australia
Paralympic silver medalists for Australia
Wheelchair category Paralympic competitors
Paralympic medalists in athletics (track and field)
Sportsmen from Victoria (Australia)
Australian male wheelchair racers
People from Ivanhoe, Victoria
Sportspeople from Melbourne